The William Breman Jewish Heritage Museum, colloquially known as The Breman, is a cultural center in Atlanta dedicated to Jewish history, culture and arts with special emphasis on Georgia and the Holocaust. The Breman, which opened in 1996, is the largest museum of its kind in the Southeast, and it is located at the corner of 18th Street and Spring Street, across the street from the Center for Puppetry Arts, in Midtown. The museum is named for Atlanta businessman William Breman, a philanthropist active in the Jewish community of Atlanta.

Exhibitions 

The museum has several exhibitions, permanent and traveling, which educate visitors about Jewish values, customs and traditions. Through multimedia works such as film, music, and visual arts, exhibits explore universal themes, such as personal responsibility, community building, and cross-cultural understanding.

The museum's permanent exhibition is Absence of Humanity: The Holocaust Years, 1933-1945.

Past exhibitions have featured words and pictures by Maurice Sendak, author of Where the Wild Things Are, an exploration of the Golden Age of Comic Books, 1938-1950, and the story of Rich's department store, Return to Rich's: The Story Behind The Store.

Research & Collections 

Also housed at the Breman Museum are the Ida Pearle and Joseph Cuba Archives for Southern Jewish History, Savannah Jewish Archives, and Genealogy center, documenting the history of Jewish life in Georgia and the Southeast. This particular collection has personal stories and historical memorabilia. The museum has an extensive exhibition pertaining to the struggles the Jewish people endured in Poland, Germany, Czechoslovakia, and Greece before and during the Holocaust. It also tells the stories of how Holocaust survivors came to the southeast and created new lives for themselves. Also featured are oral history interviews with Holocaust survivors.

References

External links 

 The William Breman Jewish Heritage Museum official website
 Jewish Federation of Greater Atlanta

Ethnic museums in Georgia (U.S. state)
Holocaust museums in the United States
History museums in Georgia (U.S. state)
Jewish museums in the United States
Museums in Atlanta
Museums established in 1996
Jews and Judaism in Atlanta